Susana Correia (born 1976) is a Portuguese politician. As a member of the Portuguese Socialist Party (PS), she has been a deputy in the Portuguese Assembly of the Republic since 2019.

Early life and education

Susana Alexandra Lopes Correia was born on 10 June 1976 in the municipality of Santa Maria da Feira, in the Aveiro District of Portugal. She obtained a degree in marketing from the University of Aveiro and subsequently obtained qualifications in accounting and administration from the same university.

Career
At the end of 1998 Correia started work at the Centro Hospitalar de Entre Douro e Vouga (CHEDV), a state-run hospital in Santa Maria da Feira, where she coordinated the emergency service. She continued to work at the hospital until she was elected to the National Assembly in 2019.

Political career
In 1999, Correia was asked by the president of the parish council of Espargo in Santa Maria da Feira to assist in the council's secretariat. In 2001 she was herself asked by the Socialist Party to run for president of the council. Successful, she held the position until 2013. From 2013 to 2017 she served as a councillor on the Santa Maria da Feira municipal council and in 2013 she also became a member of the PS National Political Commission. In 2019, she was elected to the Assembly of the Republic on the PS list for the Aveiro District. In the early national election, held in January 2022, in which the PS won an overall majority, she was re-elected for the Aveiro constituency as the fifth person on the PS list, with the PS winning 8 seats in the District.

Between 2019 and 2021 Correia was a member of the Health Committee and the Foreign Affairs Committee of the Assembly, and served on two working groups, on medically assisted procreation and mental health.

References

1976 births
Living people
People from Santa Maria da Feira
Socialist Party (Portugal) politicians
Members of the Assembly of the Republic (Portugal)
Women members of the Assembly of the Republic (Portugal)
University of Aveiro alumni